Carla Kihlstedt (born 1971) is an American composer, violinist, vocalist, and multi-instrumentalist, originally from Lancaster, Pennsylvania and currently working from a home studio on Cape Cod.

She is a founding member of Tin Hat Trio (1997, renamed Tin Hat), Sleepytime Gorilla Museum, The Book of Knots, Causing a Tiger, and Rabbit Rabbit. Other musical projects include 2 Foot Yard, Charming Hostess and Minamo (Carla Kihlstedt & Satoko Fujii). She is a recognized classical composer who has performed with the International Contemporary Ensemble (ICE), has worked occasionally on projects with Tom Waits, John Zorn, and Fred Frith, and recorded numerous albums as a guest or session musician. Kihlstedt has studied at the Peabody Conservatory of Music, San Francisco Conservatory of Music, and Oberlin Conservatory of Music.

In February 2012 she founded Rabbit Rabbit with her husband (and former Sleepytime Gorilla Museum drummer) Matthias Bossi. Rabbit Rabbit released their debut album, Rabbit Rabbit Radio – Vol. 1 in 2013. The band revolves around a song-a-month subscription website called Rabbit Rabbit Radio.

Personal life
She is the sister of American actress Rya Kihlstedt.

Discography

Collaborations and bands
Phil Gelb, Carla Kihlstedt, John Shiurba, Matthew Sperry
1998–99 – Smoking Balance: The Complete Recordings (Limited Sedition, 2011)

Charming Hostess
1999 – Eat (Vaccination)
2004 – Punch (RēR)
2004 – Sarajevo Blues (Tzadik)

Tin Hat
1999 – Memory Is an Elephant (Angel)
2000 – Helium (Angel)
2002 – The Rodeo Eroded (Ropeadope/Rykodisc)
2004 – Book of Silk (Ropeadope/Rykodisc)
2007 – The Sad Machinery of Spring (Hannibal)
2007 – La giusta distanza (OST, Radiofandango)	
2010 – Foreign Legion (BAG)
2012 – The Rain Is a Handsome Animal (New Amsterdam)

Sleepytime Gorilla Museum
2001 – Grand Opening and Closing (Seeland/Belle Antique/Chaosophy)
2003 – Live (Sickroom)
2004 – Of Natural History (Web of Mimicry)
2005 – The Face with Shinichi "Momo" Koga (DVD, not on label)
2007 – In Glorious Times (The End)
2 Foot Yard
2003 – 2 Foot Yard (Tzadik)
2008 – Borrowed Arms (Yard Work/CD Baby)

Lesli Dalaba, Fred Frith, Eric Glick Rieman & Carla Kihlstedt
2003 – Dalaba Frith Glick Rieman Kihlstedt (Accretions)

The Book of Knots
2004 – The Book of Knots (Arclight)
2007 – Traineater (ANTI-)
2011 – Garden of Fainting Stars (Ipecac)

Carla Kihlstedt & Shahzad Ismaily
2004 – Flying Low (Holy Night in the Outhouse)

Carla Kihlstedt, Fred Frith & Stevie Wishart
2006 – The Compass, Log and Lead (Intakt)

Carla Kihlstedt & Satoko Fujii
2007 – Minamo (Henceforth)
2009 – Kuroi Kawa ~ Black River (Tzadik)

Cosa Brava
2010 – Ragged Atlas (Intakt)
2012 – The Letter (Intakt)

Causing a Tiger
2010 – Causing a Tiger (Les Disques Victo)
2011 – How We Held Our Post (Twelve Cups)

Carla Kihlstedt & Matthias Bossi
2008 – Ravish (And Other Tales for the Stage) with Dan Rathbun (Twelve Cups)
2011 – Still You Lay Dreaming: Tales for the Stage, II (self-released)
2012 – Niagara Falling: Tales for the Stage, III (self-released)

Rabbit Rabbit
2013 – Rabbit Rabbit Radio – Vol. 1 (self-released)
2014 – Rabbit Rabbit Radio – Vol. 2: Swallow Me Whole (self-released)
2015 – Rabbit Rabbit Radio – Vol. 3: Year of the Wooden Horse (self-released)
2018 – Black Inscription (self-released)

As a guest or session musician
1994 – Carnival Skin – Dreamchair Music
1998 – Twelve Minor – Ben Goldberg
1998 – III – The Grassy Knoll
1998 – What Is the Difference Between Stripping & Playing the Violin? – Masaoka Orchestra
1998 – Buddy Systems – Selected Duos and Trios – Gino Robair
1998 – Sonarchy 1998 – Sonarchy Trio: Kihlstedt, Gino Robair, Matthew Sperry (released 2008)
1999 – Beauty and the Bloodsucker – Eugene Chadbourne and the Insect and Western Party
1999 – Half-wit Anthems – Deadweight
1999 – Bryant Street – Dubtribe Sound System
1999 – California – Mr. Bungle
1999 – Blue – Third Eye Blind
1999 – Pokey in the Bobo – Baby Snufkin
2000 – Revolver (A New Spin) – Ann Dyer 
2000 – Shuffle Play: Elegies for the Recording Angel – John Schott
2000 – American Pi – Austin Willacy
2001 – This Ungodly Hour – Mumble & Peg
2002 – Alice – Tom Waits
2002 – Trilectic – Jewlia Eisenberg
2003 – Rybi Tuk – Už Jsme Doma
2003 – Ghost Taxi – Eesk
2004 – I'm Gonna Stop Killing – Carla Bozulich
2004 – Timelines – Lesli Dalaba
2004 – To Each According... – Redressers
2004 – An Alligator in Your Wallet – Rova::Orkestrova
2005 – Tommyland: The Ride – Tommy Lee
2005 – Love Songs – Peter Garland
2005 – Motel – PAK
2005 – Electric Ascension – Rova::Orkestrova
2005 – Thin Pillow – Thin Pillow 
2006 – There Be Squabbles Ahead – Stolen Babies
2006 – The Door, the Hat, the Chair, the Fact – Ben Goldberg
2006 – Half the Perfect World – Madeleine Peyroux
2006 – Orphans: Brawlers, Bawlers & Bastards – Tom Waits
2006 – Dreaming Through the Noise – Vienna Teng
2006 – The Happy End Problem – Fred Frith
2007 – A Distant Youth – Wu Fei
2007 – A Handful of World; Kafka Songs – Lisa Bielawa
2007 – Two Rooms of Uranium Inside 83 Markers – Moe! Staiano's Moe!kestra!
2008 – Unsquare – Maybe Monday 
2008 – Our Bright Future – Tracy Chapman
2008 – Diana and James – Greg Copeland
2009 – Sugar – Mary Bragg
2009 – Fear Draws Misfortune – Cheer-Accident
2009 – Nowhere, Sideshow, Thin Air – Fred Frith
2009 – Bare Bones – Madeleine Peyroux
2010 – Eye to Ear III – Fred Frith
2012 – Secrets of Secrets – Aaron Novik
2015 – Orphic Machine – Ben Goldberg
2020 - Super Meat Boy Forever - RIDICULON
2021 - The Binding of Isaac: Repentance - RIDICULON

See also
Romantic Warriors II: A Progressive Music Saga About Rock in Opposition
Romantic Warriors II: Special Features DVD

References

External links

  The official Carla Kihlstedt web site
 Carla Kihlstedt on Bandcamp
 Interview with Carla Kihlstedt from Hitchhiking Off the Map radio program (RealAudio file; click to listen)
 Guest host of Bowed Radio – Episode 006 (50 minutes, mp3 format)

Musicians from Lancaster, Pennsylvania
Musicians from Oakland, California
Living people
Singers from Pennsylvania
Avant-garde jazz musicians
American women composers
American jazz composers
American experimental musicians
American women jazz musicians
1971 births
Singers from California
Jazz musicians from Pennsylvania
Jazz musicians from California
21st-century American singers
21st-century American women singers
21st-century American violinists
Lancaster Country Day School alumni
Intakt Records artists